Clover is a surname.  Notable people with the surname include:

 Carol J. Clover, American professor
 Elzada Clover (1896–1980), American botanist
 Joseph Clover (1779–1853), British portrait painter
 Joseph Thomas Clover (1825–1882), pioneer anaesthetist, nephew of Joseph Clover
 Joshua Clover (born 1962), American writer, poet, and university professor

See also
Clover (given name), the given name
 Jen Cloher (born 1973), Australian singer, songwriter, and record producer